Colchester Crutched Friary was a friary in Essex, England.

Monasteries in Essex